The 360th Civil Affairs Brigade is a civil affairs brigade of the United States Army stationed at Fort Jackson, South Carolina. It is a unit of the United States Army Reserve and falls under the 352nd Civil Affairs Command.

Subordinate Units 
 Headquarters and Headquarters Company, 360th Civil Affairs Brigade (Airborne)
 404th Civil Affairs Battalion (Airborne) – Fort Dix, New Jersey
 412th Civil Affairs Battalion (Airborne) – Whitehall, OH
 450th Civil Affairs Battalion (Airborne) – Riverdale Park, MD
    478th Civil Affairs Battalion (Airborne) – Perrine, Florida

References

360
360
360
360